Kay Bachman Sumner is a television and film producer who was the producer and co-creator for the television series The Dog Whisperer, for which she received Emmy Award nominations in 2006, 2007, and 2009. Sumner was creator and producer of Any Woman Can Fix It, a home improvement television series for women, played on CBC (Canada) for sixty-five shows run. The show was eleven years in syndication.  She was creator and Producer for Eye Bet for CTV Network, and staff producer for ABC O&O’s, Morning Show and The Anniversary Game for WXYZ-TV, and the  Chicago Show for WLS-TV.

Partial filmography
 Eye Bet (1971–1974)
 Any Woman Can Fix It (65 episodes, 1974-19745)
 The New Quiz Kids (1978–1980)
 Shadow Dancing (1988)
 Dreams (2010)
 Dog Whisperer (158 episodes, 2004–2012)

Recognition

Awards and nominations
Her 1988 film Shadow Dancing won a CSC Award from the CSC in 1989 for 'Best Cinematography in Theatrical Feature', as well as receiving Genie Award nominations for 'Best Achievement in Cinematography', 'Best Achievement in Costume Design', and 'Best Original Song'.  Her produced series The Dog Whisperer, received Emmy Award nominations in 2006, 2007, and 2009 for 'Outstanding Reality Program'. The Dog Whisperer also won the People's Choice Award in 2010 for 'Best Animal Show' and 'Best Variety or Reality Show' at the 2008's Imagine Awards.

References

External links
 

Living people
Year of birth missing (living people)